The article provides links to lists of military divisions arranged by ordinal number, name, country or conflict.

By number 

1st
2nd
3rd
4th
5th
6th
7th
8th
9th
10th
11th
12th
13th
14th
15th
16th
17th
18th
19th
20th
21st
22nd
23rd
24th
25th
26th
27th
28th
29th
30th
31st
32nd
33rd
34th
35th
36th
37th
38th
39th
40th
41st
42nd
43rd
44th
45th
46th
47th
48th
49th
50th
51st
52nd
53rd
54th
55th
56th
57th
58th
59th
60th
61st
62nd
63rd
64th
65th
66th
67th
68th
69th
70th
71st
72nd
73rd
74th
75th
76th
77th
78th
79th
80th
81st
82nd
83rd
84th
85th
86th
87th
88th
89th
90th
91st
92nd
93rd
94th
95th
96th
97th
98th
99th
100th
101st
102nd
103rd
104th
105th
106th
107th
108th
109th
110th
111th
112th
113th
114th
115th
116th
117th
118th
119th
120th

By name

See also 

 List of Australian divisions in World War I
 List of Australian divisions in World War II
 List of British divisions in World War I
 List of British divisions in World War II 
 List of British Empire divisions in World War II
 List of Brazilian divisions in World War II
 List of Canadian divisions in World War I
 List of Canadian divisions in World War II
 List of Chinese divisions in World War II
 List of Finnish divisions in the Winter War
 List of Finnish divisions in the Continuation War
 List of French divisions in World War II
 List of German divisions in World War II
 List of Indian divisions in World War I
 List of Indian divisions in World War II
 List of Italian divisions in World War II
 List of Japanese Infantry Divisions
 List of New Zealand divisions in World War II
 List of Philippine divisions in World War II
 List of Polish divisions in World War I
 List of Polish divisions in World War II
 List of South African Divisions in World War II
 List of Soviet Union divisions 1917-1945
 List of divisions of the United States Army
 List of United States Marine Corps divisions

Military divisions